Khwaja Muhammad Arif Riwgari is the first of the group of Central Asian Sufi teachers known simply as Khwajagan (the Masters) of the Naqshbandi order. His shrine is at Riwgar, or now is known as Shofirkon, about 45 km North of Bukhara, in today's Uzbekistan,

Life

Born in Riwgar, today called Safirkon, forty-five kilometers north of Bukhara. He studied the supervision of the master of his time, Abdul Khaliq Ghajadwani. He was the deputy of Abdul Khaliq Ghajadwani, Khwāja Abdul Khaliq Ghajadwani had four deputies. When he died, his first deputy Khwāja Ahmad Siddīq succeeded him and took over the seat of spiritual directorship and trained the seekers in this noble path. When he was close to dying, he urged all his followers to seek the company of Khwaja Muhammad Arif Riwgari.

Contribution
Arif Riwgari wrote a treatise on Tasawwuf, called “Ārif Nāma”, and one of its manuscripts is located in the library of Khāniqāh Mūsā Zaī , district Dera Ismail Khan, Pakistan. At the end of his times, Arif Riwgari appointed Mahmūd Anjīr-Faghnawī as his deputy and all his companions associated themselves with Mahmūd Faghnawī after his demise.

Death 
Arif Riwgari died on 1st Shawwāl 616 AH (December 1219 CE). He was buried in his hometown Riwgar (Shafirkon, Bukhara, Uzbekistan), where his noble tomb is a place of blessings and is visited by many.

See also

Sources
 The Naqshbandi Order, Hamid Algar
 Wafayat al-A'yan, Ibn Khallikan

Bibliography
 Hadhrāt al-Quds, by Shaykh Badr ad-Din Sirhindī
 http://maktabah.org/blog/?p=1507
 Rashahāt Ain al-Hayāt, by Mawlānā Alī ibn Husain Safī

Sufi teachers
1219 deaths
Naqshbandi order
Year of birth unknown